In mathematics, the subderivative, subgradient, and subdifferential generalize the derivative to convex functions which are not necessarily differentiable. Subderivatives arise in convex analysis, the study of convex functions, often in connection to convex optimization.

Let  be a real-valued convex function  defined on an open interval of the real line. Such a function need not be differentiable at all points: For example, the absolute value function  is non-differentiable when . However, as seen in the graph on the right (where  in blue has non-differentiable kinks similar to the absolute value function), for any  in the domain of the function one can draw a line which goes through the point  and which is everywhere either touching or below the graph of f. The slope of such a line is called a subderivative.

Definition 
Rigorously, a subderivative of a convex function  at a point  in the open interval  is a real number  such that 

for all .

If  is convex, then its subdifferential at any point is non-empty.

Example 

Consider the function  which is convex. Then, the subdifferential at the origin is the interval . The subdifferential at any point  is the singleton set , while the subdifferential at any point  is the singleton set .

Properties 

 A point  is a global minimum of a convex function  if and only if zero is contained in the subdifferential. This last property is a generalization of the fact that the derivative of a function differentiable at a local minimum is zero.
This reads as "the subdifferential of a sum is the sum of the subdifferentials."

The subgradient 
The concepts of subderivative and subdifferential can be generalized to functions of several variables. If  is a real-valued convex function defined on a convex open set in the Euclidean space , a vector  in that space is called a subgradient at  if for any  one has that

where the dot denotes the dot product. 
The subdifferential is always a nonempty convex compact set.

These concepts generalize further to convex functions  on a convex set in a locally convex space .

The subdifferential is always a convex closed set. It can be an empty set; consider for example an unbounded operator, which is convex, but has no subgradient. If  is continuous, the subdifferential is nonempty.

History 

The subdifferential on convex functions was introduced by Jean Jacques Moreau and R. Tyrrell Rockafellar in the early 1960s. The generalized subdifferential for nonconvex functions was introduced by F.H. Clarke and R.T. Rockafellar in the early 1980s.

See also 
 Weak derivative
 Subgradient method

References

External links 

Generalizations of the derivative
Convex optimization
Variational analysis